The Chester Ronning Centre for the Study of Religion and Public Life is a research centre on the University of Alberta's Augustana Campus in Camrose, Alberta. It is the first such centre in a public university in Canada to focus on the intersection of religion and public life.

Background
The Ronning Centre is named in for Chester Alvin Ronning, Canadian diplomat and principal of Camrose Lutheran College from 1927 to 1942. The Chester Ronning Centre for the Study of Religion and Public Life grew from the merger of Augustana University College with the University of Alberta in 2004. The centre's activities involve a diversity of communities. It seeks to enhance debate on contested issues through lively discussion.

References

External links
Chester Ronning Centre for the Study of Religion and Public Life

Schools of religion
Research institutes in Canada
Religion in Canada
Educational organizations based in Alberta
University of Alberta
Camrose, Alberta
Religion and society